Ciénega is a municipality in the Márquez Province, part of Boyacá Department, Colombia. The municipality borders Viracachá and Soracá in the north, Rondón in the east and south and Ramiriquí in the south and west.

Etymology 
The name Ciénega comes from Chibcha and means "Place of water".

History 
The area around Ciénega in the times before the Spanish conquest was part of the Muisca Confederation, a loose confederation of different rulers of the Muisca. Ciénega was ruled by the zaque based in Hunza. On his way to the legendary El Dorado, conquistador Gonzalo Jiménez de Quesada passed through Ciénega.

Modern Ciénega was founded on October 22, 1818 by José Cayetano Vasquez, son of the owner of the main hacienda in the village.

Economy 
Main economical activities of Ciénega are livestock farming (66 %) and agriculture (31 %). Among the agricultural products cultivated are potatoes, maize, peas and arracacha, tree tomato and uchuva.

Born in Ciénega 
 Jesús María Coronado Caro, bishop
 Hector Páez, professional mountainbiker

References 

Municipalities of Boyacá Department
Populated places established in 1818
1818 establishments in the Spanish Empire